The Amargosa tryonia, scientific name Tryonia variegata, is a species of small freshwater snail with a gill and an operculum, an aquatic gastropod mollusk in the family Hydrobiidae. This species is endemic to California, United States.  The common name refers to the Amargosa River.

References

Endemic fauna of the United States
Tryonia
Gastropods described in 1987
Taxonomy articles created by Polbot